The 2016 Men's Australian Country Championships was a field hockey tournament held in Darwin, Northern Territory between 24-31 July 2016.

NSW Country won the tournament by defeating the ADF 4–1 in the final. WA Country won the bronze medal by defeating QLD Country 1–0 in the third and fourth playoff.

Teams
Unlike other National Australian Championships the Australian Country Championships only comprises teams from regional/country associations of each Australian State, as well as a team from the Australian Defence Force.

 ADF 
  NSW Country
  NT Country
  QLD Country
  SA Country
  VIC Country
  WA Country

Competition format
The tournament is played in a round-robin format, with each team facing each other once. Final placings after the pool matches determine playoffs. 

The fifth and sixth placed teams contest the fifth and sixth-place match, the third and fourth placed teams contest the third and fourth-place match, and the top two teams compete in the final.

Results

Pool matches

Classification matches

Fifth and sixth place

Third and fourth place

Final

Statistics

Final standings

References

External links

2016
2016 in Australian field hockey